Appointment to the position of Crown Steward and Bailiff of the Chiltern Hundreds is a procedural device to allow Members of Parliament to resign from the House of Commons of the United Kingdom. Since MPs are technically unable to resign, resort is had to a legal fiction. An appointment to an "office of profit under The Crown" disqualifies an individual from sitting as a Member of Parliament (MP). Several offices were used in the past to allow MPs to resign, only the Crown Stewardships of the Chiltern Hundreds and the Manor of Northstead are in present use.

Resignation 

On 2 March 1624, a resolution was passed by the House of Commons making it illegal for an MP to quit or wilfully give up his seat. Believing that officers of the Crown could not remain impartial, the House passed a resolution on 30 December 1680 stating that an MP who "shall accept any Office, or Place of Profit, from the Crown, without the Leave of this House ... shall be expelled [from] this House." However, MPs were able to hold Crown Stewardships until 1740, when Sir Watkin Williams-Wynn was deemed to have vacated his Commons seat after becoming Steward of the Lordship and Manor of Bromfield and Yale.

The Chiltern Hundreds last needed a Crown Steward in the 16th century. When John Pitt wished to vacate his seat for Wareham in order to stand for Dorchester, the Crown Stewardship of the Chiltern Hundreds was available for this purpose. Pitt was appointed Crown Steward on 25 January 1751.

A number of other offices were subsequently used for resignation, but only the Chiltern Hundreds and the Crown Steward and Bailiff of the Manor of Northstead are still in use. Appointees to the Chiltern Hundreds are alternated with the Manor of Northstead, allowing two MPs to resign at once. When more than two MPs resign, such as the 1985 walkout of Ulster Unionist MPs, appointees are dismissed after a few hours to allow other resigning MPs to take their place. The Parliamentary Information Office has produced a list of those appointed to the office of Steward of the Chiltern Hundreds since 1850.

Key

Up to 1849

1850 to 1899

1900 to 1949

1950 to 1999

2000 to present

See also

Office still in use
List of stewards of the Manor of Northstead

Offices not in use
List of Stewards of the Manor of East Hendred
List of Stewards of the Manor of Hempholme
List of Stewards of the Manor of Old Shoreham
List of Stewards of the Manor of Poynings

References
General

Specific

Chiltern Hundreds